The Wizard or Wizard is a nickname for:

People nicknamed The Wizard 
 Dhyan Chand (1905 –  1979), an Indian field hockey player
 Gary Crowton (born 1957), American football coach
 Jeff Farmer (footballer) (born 1977), Australian rules footballer
 Bobby Hoff (1939–2013), American poker player
 Jeff Mills (born 1963), American techno DJ and producer
 Japhet N'Doram (born 1966), Chadian retired footballer
 Erik Rasmussen (footballer) (born 1960), Danish former footballer and manager
 Jacob Schaefer, Sr. (1855–1910), American billiards player
 Ozzie Smith (born 1954), American Major League Baseball player
 Vassilis Stravopodis (born 1948), Greek former footballer
 Simon Whitlock (born 1969), Australian darts player
 Ray Whitney (ice hockey) (born 1972), Canadian former National Hockey League player
 Gus Williams (basketball) (born 1953), National Basketball Association player
 Bogdan Wołkowski (born 1957), Polish professional billiards trick-shot artist and entertainer
 Hakim Ziyech (born 1993), Dutch-Moroccan footballer for Premier League club Chelsea

People nicknamed Wizard 
 Lars Bo (1924–1999), Danish artist and writer
 Murray Wier (born 1926), American former basketball player

See also 
 Welsh Wizard (disambiguation)
 Thomas Edison (1847–1931), American inventor and businessman nicknamed the "Wizard of Menlo Park"
 Warren Buffett (born 1930), American business magnate nicknamed the "Wizard of Omaha"
 Frankie Carle (1903–2001), American pianist and bandleader nicknamed the "Wizard of the Keyboard"
 Ron Fraser (1933–2013), American baseball coach, the "Wizard of College Baseball"
 Momosuke Fukuzawa (1868–1938), Japanese businessman, the "Wizard of the Money Markets"
 Jørgen Kristensen (born 1946), Danish former footballer, "Troldmanden" ("the Wizard")
 Stanley Matthews (1915–2000), English football player, the "Wizard of the Dribble"
 Roy Smeck (1900–1994), American musician, the "Wizard of the Strings"
 Bert le Vack (1887–1931), British motorcycle racer, the "Wizard of Brooklands"
 Yrjö Väisälä (1891–1971), Finnish astronomer and physicist, the "Wizard of Tuorla"
 John Wooden (1910–2010), American member of the Basketball Hall of Fame as both a college basketball head coach and player, the "Wizard of Westwood"
 The Magician (nickname), a list of people
 El Mago (Spanish for "the Magician"), a list of people
 El Brujo (disambiguation) (Spanish for "the Wizard"), includes a list of people
 Darío Verón (born 1979), Paraguayan footballer nicknamed "Hechicero" ("The Wizard")
 Raymond Goethals (1921–2004), Belgian football coach nicknamed "le sorcier" ("the Wizard")

Lists of people by nickname